Bertwell is an unincorporated community in Saskatchewan.

Hudson Bay No. 394, Saskatchewan
Unincorporated communities in Saskatchewan